"What Does the Bee Do?" is the fourth episode of the second season of the HBO television series Boardwalk Empire, and 16th episode overall. First aired on October 16, 2011, it was written by executive story editor Steve Kornacki and directed by Ed Bianchi.

Plot 
Nucky looks to Rothstein for a port to receive alcohol, since the Coast Guard is blockading Atlantic City. Rothstein instructs Lansky and Luciano to oversee the Philadelphia delivery. Nucky also sends Owen Sleater to bomb Doyle's still. Margaret asks for 'money for the children' from Nucky, which she proceeds to hide in her dresser.

The Commodore, unbeknownst to Nucky, suffers a stroke and can no longer communicate, forcing Jimmy to take control. Eli is unhappy, dubious that Jimmy can handle the situation without the Commodore's connections. While treating the bedridden Commodore, Gillian asks him if he remembers the time he raped her, then proceeds to beat him.

Nucky throws Bader a birthday party, which Jack Dempsey drops in on. The prostitutes at the party were transported interstate, which is a federal felony. This prompts his attorney to suggest that Nucky use this as a means of making his election-rigging charges federal, thus enabling his higher connections to assist him.

Angela asks Harrow if he'd consider posing for her.  He agrees and as he sits for the portrait tells her about how he lost his love for his twin sister.

Chalky is released from jail. Having been able to provide good education and upbringing for his family, he gets angry at a dinner party, feeling his family and guest are condescending to him as a simple 'country' man.

Two of Van Alden's men begin to suspect him of corruption after witnessing him participating in dubious activities. When they investigate Doyle's store house, the bomb that Sleater set explodes, badly burning one of them.

Title
"What Does The Bee Do?" is a children's poem from the late 1800s by Christina Rossetti. Margaret Schroeder's daughter recites it in the episode.

Reception

Critical reception 
IGN gave the episode a score of 8.5 out of 10, saying that it "effortlessly hits that sweet spot between advancing the plot while developing characters, much in the same way that the Season 2 premiere did." The A.V. Club rated the episode an "A−".

Ratings 
The episode was watched by 2.546 million viewers. It fell two tenths, to 1.0 million adults 18-49 rating.

References

External links 
  "What Does the Bee Do?" at HBO.com
 

2011 American television episodes
Boardwalk Empire episodes
Television episodes directed by Ed Bianchi